Melzericium is a genus of corticioid fungi in the family Atheliaceae. The widespread genus contains three species.

References

External links

Atheliales